Rajpipla railway station is a small railway station in Narmada district, Gujarat. Its code is RAJ. It serves Rajpipla town. The station consists of a single platform. The platform is not well sheltered. It lacks many facilities including water and sanitation.

Trains 

 Ankleshwar–Rajpipla Passenger

References

See also
 Rajpipla State Railway

Vadodara railway division
Railway stations in Narmada district